Vintage is an album by Michael Bolton, released in 2003.

The album debuted at #76 in the Billboard 200 chart and selling under 250,000 copies in the US.

Track listing
 "The Very Thought of You" (Ray Noble and His Orchestra cover) – 3:21
 "All the Way" (Frank Sinatra cover) – 3:33
 "A Kiss to Build a Dream On" (Louis Armstrong cover) – 3:02
 "If I Could" (Ray Charles cover) – 3:08
 "At Last" (Glenn Miller and his Orchestra cover) – 3:37 
 "When I Fall in Love" (Jeri Southern cover) – 3:19
 "You Don't Know Me" (Eddy Arnold cover) – 3:14
 "Smile" (Charlie Chaplin cover) – 3:18
 "Daddy's Little Girl" (The Mills Brothers cover) – 2:12
 "Summertime" (George Gershwin cover) – 4:32
 "What Are You Doing the Rest of Your Life?" (Michael Dees cover) – 2:55
 "God Bless the Child" (Billie Holiday cover; bonus track on Special Edition version) – 3:59

Personnel

Performers
Michael Bolton – vocals, arrangements, string arrangements
Clay Perry – piano, keyboards, string arrangements and orchestration
Michael Levine – piano
Rick Krive – Hammond organ
Michael Thompson – guitar
Dan Warner – guitar
Manny Lopez – acoustic guitar
Julio Hernandez – bass
Lee Levin – drums
Ed Calle – saxophone
Jason Carder – trumpet
Rudy Perez – arrangements, string arrangements
Gary Lindsay – string arrangements and orchestration, conductor
Alfredo Oliva – concertmaster
Miami Symphonic Strings – strings

Production
 Producers – Michael Bolton and Rudy Perez
 Executive Producer – Louis Levin
 Engineers – Steve Milo, Joel Numa, Clay Perry and Bruce Weeden.
 Mastering – Bob Ludwig 
 Art Direction – Jim De Barros
 Artwork – Michael Skinner

References

Michael Bolton albums
2003 albums
Traditional pop albums